State Road 142 (SR 142) is a State Road in the western section of the state of Indiana. The entire road is two-lanes and passes through farmland and wooded areas. SR 142 was originally introduced in 1934 to connect Eminence to SR 39. The road was paved by the late 1960s.

Route description 
SR 142 begins at an intersection with SR 42 in Eminence in western Morgan County. The highway proceeds due east into Morgan County as a two-lane road, passing through farmland. The road becomes curvy as it enters a wooded area. SR 142 passes through the unincorporated community of Wilbur, before ending at SR 39. The highest traffic count is at the eastern end of SR 142, where 1,557 vehicles travel the highway on average each day. The lowest traffic count is west of Wilbur, where 1,045 vehicles travel the highway on average each day.

History
The Indiana State Highway Commission designated SR 142 in 1934. The original routing started at SR 42 in Eminence and ran east to SR 39 much as it does today. The road between Eminence and Wilbur had a gravel or stone surface, while the road east of Wilbur was under construction. In 1935 the construction east of Wilbur was completed and the road surface was either gravel or stone. The highway commissioned paved the entire road between 1966 and 1967. Since its paving, SR 142 has not undergone any major changes.

Major intersections

References

External links

142
Transportation in Morgan County, Indiana